The 2013 EuroHockey Club Champions Cup was the 41st edition of the premier European competition for women's field hockey clubs. The preliminary round of the competition was held in Hamburg, Germany from 29 March–1 April, while the final of the competition was held in Bloemendaal, Netherlands on 19 May.

Den Bosch defeated defending champion Laren in the final 4–2 to win their thirteenth title. Hamburg and Rot-Weiss Köln also reached the final four, losing in the semi-finals.

Teams

 Atasport
 Grodno
 Leicester 
 Hamburg (HAM)
 Rot-Weiss Köln (ROT)
 Den Bosch (DBO)
 Laren (LAR)
 Club de Campo

Results

Preliminary round

Pool A

Pool B

Classification round

Semi-finals

Final

Statistics

Final standings

Goalscorers

References

2013
2013 in women's field hockey
2012–13 in European field hockey